is a railway station on the Kominato Line, in Ichihara, Chiba Prefecture, Japan, operated by the private railway operator Kominato Railway.

Lines
Kazusa-Murakami Station is served by the 39.1 km Kominato Line, and lies 2.5 km from the western terminus of the Kominato Line at Goi Station.

Station layout
Kazusa-Murakami Station has two opposed side platforms serving two tracks. The station building, which dates from 1927, is attended.

Platforms

Adjacent stations

History
Kazusa-Murakami Station was opened on February 25, 1927.

Passenger statistics
In fiscal 2010, the station was used by an average of 108 passengers daily (boarding passengers only).

See also
 List of railway stations in Japan

References

External links

  

Railway stations in Japan opened in 1927
Railway stations in Chiba Prefecture